Baie-Johan-Beetz Seaplane Base (SPB)  is located  south southwest of Baie-Johan-Beetz, in the Côte-Nord region of the province of Quebec in Canada.

References

External links
 

Certified airports in Côte-Nord